In the 2010s Private equity massively grew. Private equity was accused of "running amok" in the 2010s and resulting in numerous economic issues. Forbes has described private equity firms as fundamentally transforming over the decade Many private equity firms embraced ESG over the decade among other changes but they have been accused of greenwashing.

See also
 Private equity in the 2000s
 Private equity in the 2020s

References

2010s economic history
History of banking
History of private equity and venture capital